Davao del Sur, officially the Province of Davao del Sur, is a province in the Philippines located in the Davao Region in Mindanao. Its capital is Digos. Davao City is the largest city in terms of area and population within the province's jurisdiction, yet it is administratively independent from the province; as such, Davao City is only grouped for geographical and statistical purposes.

The province is bounded by Davao del Norte to the north, Davao Occidental to the south-east, North Cotabato and Sultan Kudarat to the west, South Cotabato and Sarangani to the south-west, and Davao Gulf to the east.

History
The beginnings of both Davao Region and Davao del Sur were associated with the foundation of Davao, which was the first town to be founded in southern Mindanao in 1848, following the conquest of the area by José Uyanguren of the Basque province of Gipuzkoa, Spain (Guipúzcoa in Spanish). In 1849, Nueva Guipúzcoa province was founded in the region conquered by Uyanguren in what is now Davao Region, with Davao, then called Nueva Vergara, as the provincial capital. Uyanguren became the provincial governor, but he failed in his efforts to develop Nueva Guipúzcoa.

Thirty-six years after the foundation of Davao, the town of Santa Cruz was founded on October 5, 1884. It is the first town to be founded south of Davao and is now the oldest in the province.

The Spanish administration in the Philippines ended in 1898 following the defeat of the Spaniards during the Spanish–American War. In the early 1900s, waves of immigrants from the Visayas, Luzon, and as well as from Japan began to live in the region, centered mainly in Davao. The region began to boom in economic growth as agricultural business proliferated in the region.

As part of the "food bowl" of what is now the province of Davao del Sur, otherwise known as the Padada Valley, the agricultural area south of the town of Santa Cruz, which is known as Digos that time, lured many migrants, majority of whom came from the Visayas and Ilocos regions to settle permanently in the area. Before World War II, an enterprising American by the name of N.E. Crumb leased  and transformed the place into an abaca plantation. This became the hub of economic activity in the locality during those days.

In 1942, during the start of the World War II in the Pacific, the first waves of invading Japanese units landed and entered the province of southern Davao.

In 1945, the liberation of southern Davao by United States and Philippine Commonwealth troops was supported by Davaoeño guerrilla fighters.

In 1967, Davao Province was divided into three provinces, one of them being Davao del Sur; the town of Digos was made its capital and would become a suburban city for the next 33 years.

On October 28, 2013, along with the Barangay Elections, a plebiscite was held to create a new province Davao Occidental, formed out of the southern part of Davao del Sur, covering the municipalities of the 2nd district of the province, namely Don Marcelino, Jose Abad Santos, Santa Maria, Sarangani and Malita (which was designated as the provincial capital) by virtue of Republic Act 10360 enacted on July 23, 2013, and the majority of votes cast were "Yes", ratifying the province.

In 2015, the National Competitiveness Council, ranked the province as the most competitive province in the country.

Geography
Davao del Sur covers a total area of  occupying the southwestern section of the Davao Region in Mindanao. The province is bounded by Davao del Norte to the north; Davao Occidental to the south-east; North Cotabato and Sultan Kudarat to the west; South Cotabato and Sarangani to the south-west ; and Davao Gulf to the east.

Administrative divisions
Davao del Sur comprises 9 municipalities and 1 component city, all encompassed by a lone legislative district. Davao City, although part of the province for geographical and statistical purposes, is governed independently from the province.

Climate
The province enjoys a mild, pleasant climate all year round. Because of its topographical characteristics and geographical location, it is rarely visited by typhoons. There is no pronounced wet or dry season.

Demographics

Davao del Sur is an ethnic mix of Visayans (mostly Cebuanos), Chinese, Japanese, and Koreans with a number of indigenous ethnic groups scattered across the province. The Cebuano language, with Davaoeño as its regional variant, is the main language of the province, although Filipino and English are also widely spoken and used in government functions and publications. Since the late 20th century, a linguistic phenomenon has developed in the Metro Davao area whereby locals have either shifted to the 'national language' (Filipino) or significantly mix Filipino terms and grammar into their Cebuano speech.

Religion
Christianity in the form of Roman Catholicism is the predominant religion in the province followed by more than 80% of the people. The remaining faiths are Islam and other Christians such as Aglipayan, Baptists, Iglesia ni Cristo, Church of Christ of Latter Day Saints (Mormons) Seventh-day Adventist, other Evangelical Christians and Jehovah's Witnesses.

Indigenous groups

Moro peoples

The major Moro ethnic group is the Kagan tribe, an Islamized group related to the Tagacaolos, Mandaya, Mansaka, and Kalagan, since Davao del Sur was once part of Sultanate of Maguindanao. Some Moro tribes that can be found in Davao del Sur are Maguindanao, Maranao, Tausug and Iranun.

Lumad peoples

The Bagobo people live in an area that extends from Davao del Sur and South Cotabato to the foot of Mount Apo and Davao City all the way to the land bordered by the Davao and Pulangi rivers and up to northern Cotabato and southeast Bukidnon. Numbering about 80,000, their traditional costume is woven from abaca fiber and heavily ornamented with beads, shells, metal discs, embroidery and brightly colored geometric applique. Though Bagobos have the most stunning costumes among the Davao ethnic groups, they wear them only on special occasions. Like the Mandayas and Mansakas, they shave their eyebrows to a thin line and file and blacken their teeth. Bagobo smiths cast little bells which are attached to pouches, bracelets, jackets, anklets and inlaid metal boxes.

The Tagacaolo people number about 23,000 and occupy the area between the western shores of the gulf and the slopes of Mount Apo. This is one of the tribes which resisted Muslim conversion and maintained a highland animistic culture.

The Kalagan people are part Islamized and part Chistianized and related to the Tagacaolos. Numbering only about 7,000, they live along the shores of Davao Gulf.

The Mangguangan people now number only 3,000. They can be found in Davao del Sur and Davao del Norte.

In both groups, women generally wear handwoven abaca tube skirts, embroidered blue cotton tops and heavy jewellery. Men sport wide blue or white fringed and embroidered trousers and a loose shirt. Red is a color only for a headman ("bagani") and for women of high status.

Aeta people

Aeta people live in some areas of Davao City all the way to Davao del Norte, Compostela Valley and Bukidnon. They are related to the Manobos of Cotabato and include sub-groups such as the Talaingod of the Kapalong forests in Davao del Norte and the Matigsalug. Numbering about 222,000, Ata men wear long-sleeved shirts, carry spears, hunt, log and grow crops. Their womenfolk wear native blouses, "malong" skirts and accessories of brass bracelets and bead necklaces. Mandaya and Mansaka are culturally related groups who are highly musical - playing the five string bamboo guitar, two-string lute, violin, flute, gong, drum and bamboo Jew's harp. They are also excellent silversmiths crafting breastplates, jewellery, daggers and knives. The Mandayas are famous for their colorful abaca fiber weaves embroidered with tribal motifs.

Economy

Art and culture

The colorful artistic heritage of Davao stems from the rich culture of its tribes. For the Bagobos, aesthetics is the meticulous carving of weapons; the elaborate decoration of inlaid metal boxes with bells; and the ornamentation of their abaca fiber dress with embroidery, shells, beads and metal discs. The Mandayas, on the other hand, have a solid tradition in weaving. To produce their famed coarse textured cloth, abaca fiber is colored with earth dyes and woven on a backstrap loom.

The final product is embroidered with bright-colored threads in geometric patterns. Some elements of tribal folklore are also included in the designs. The Mansakas, together with the Mandayas, are also expert silversmiths. They craft weapons, breastplates and dress accessories. Much of its people are Christians. Davao is also a harmonious blend of Christian and Muslim cultures. However, its most stunning cultural aspect is definitely its ethnic art which encompasses music, dance, religious ritual, dress and ornamentation.

Government

Governor:
 Yvonne Roña Cagas

Vice Governor:
 Ai-ai Cagas-Fernandez

Representative:
 Lone District of Davao del Sur
 John Tracy Cagas

See also
 Nueva Guipuzcoa Revolt

References

External links

 
 
 Davao City Travel and Tourism Guide

 
Provinces of the Philippines
Provinces of the Davao Region
States and territories established in 1967
1967 establishments in the Philippines